Diodontus is a genus of insects belonging to the family Crabronidae.

The species of this genus are found in Europe, Africa and Northern America.

Species:
 Diodontus adamsi Titus, 1909
 Diodontus afer Morice, 1911

References

Crabronidae
Hymenoptera genera